Dillon Simpson (born February 10, 1993) is a Canadian professional ice hockey defenceman who is currently playing under contract to the Cleveland Monsters of the American Hockey League (AHL). He was selected by the Edmonton Oilers in the fourth round (92nd overall) of the 2011 NHL Entry Draft. He is the son of former NHL forward Craig Simpson.

Playing career
Simpson played collegiate hockey for the University of North Dakota in the NCAA Men's Division I National Collegiate Hockey Conference (NCHC). In his senior year, Simpson's outstanding play was rewarded with a selection to the inaugural 2013–14 All-NCHC First Team.

After four seasons within the Oilers organization, Simpson left as a free agent and signed a two-year, two-way contract with the Columbus Blue Jackets on July 1, 2018. He was assigned to AHL affiliate, the Cleveland Monsters, for the duration of his contract with the Blue Jackets, adding a veteran presence to the blueline.

As a free agent from the Blue Jackets, Simpson opted to remain in the organization despite no NHL contract, agreeing to a one-year AHL extension with the Monsters on October 12, 2020.

Career statistics

Awards and honours

References

External links
 

1993 births
Living people
Bakersfield Condors players
Canadian ice hockey defencemen
Cleveland Monsters players
Edmonton Oilers draft picks
Edmonton Oilers players
North Dakota Fighting Hawks men's ice hockey players
Oklahoma City Barons players
Ice hockey people from Edmonton
Spruce Grove Saints players